Yemima Ben-Menahem (born 23 December 1946) is a professor (Emerita) of philosophy at the Hebrew University of Jerusalem. Her main area of expertise is philosophy of science, in particular philosophy of modern physics.

Biography 
Yemima Goldschmidt (later Ben-Menahem) earned a BSc in physics and mathematics in 1969 and an MSc (summa cum laude) in philosophy of science in 1972, both from the Hebrew University of Jerusalem. She earned her PhD in 1983 with a dissertation entitled "Paradoxes and Intuitions", under the direction of Hilary Putnam of Harvard University and Mark Steiner of the Hebrew University.

Ben-Menachem is married to Hanina Ben-Menachem, a professor of law at Hebrew University, with whom she has four children. Her mother was Elisabeth Goldschmidt, a pioneer of genetic research in Israel, and Yosef Goldschmidt, a Knesset Member and Deputy Minister representing the National Religious Party.

Academic career
In 2001, Ben-Menahem founded the Journal Aleph: Historical Studies in Science and Judaism, which is a biannual, peer-reviewed academic publication. She served as Director of the Edelstein Center for the History and Philosophy of Science, Technology and Medicine at the Hebrew University. Since 2006, she has been member of the Academic Board of the Einstein Papers Project.

In 2007, she curated the exhibition Newton's Secrets at the National Library of Israel.

Ben-Menahem devoted several papers and a book to conventionalism, a position first articulated by Henri Poincaré in the context of geometry. According to conventionalists, many of the assertions we take to express objective truths, are in fact conventions in disguise, derived from definitions or methodological decisions that are not forced on us by logic, mathematics, or empirical fact, and about which we have discretion. Ben-Menahem reads twentieth century science and philosophy from the perspective of the impact of conventionalism on these fields. The pronounced influence of conventionalism, according to her, is manifest in the philosophy of logic and mathematics, the theory of relativity, and the writings of leading twentieth century philosophers including Carnap, Wittgenstein, Putnam, and Quine.

In Causation in Science, Ben-Menahem offers a novel account of causation, centered on the notion of causal constraint rather than the common notion of causal relation. The book analyses the interrelations between constraints such as determinism, locality, conservation laws, and variation principles. In response to the classic problem of human freedom, Ben-Menahem expounds a concept of lawlessness that permits human action to be subject to causes, without being derivable from, and predictable by, laws of nature.

Ben-Menahem addresses several controversial issues in the history and philosophy of quantum mechanics. She analyses the relation between quantum nonlocality and indeterminism, arguing that the payoff relation between these characteristics secures the compatibility of quantum mechanics with the special theory of relativity. She takes issue with the common understanding of the PBR theorem and with the received account of Schrödinger's position and the Bohr-Einstein controversy.

Ben-Menahem sees the notion of contingency as crucial to the philosophy of history and to the possibility for human beings to make a difference in the course of historical events. Her analysis of the concepts of necessity and contingency in history draws on an analogy with the notions of stability and instability in science, where they play a prominent role in many areas, for instance, statistical mechanics and chaos theory.

One of the most debated subjects in contemporary philosophy of science is scientific realism, a position committed to the possibility of scientific truth and scientific knowledge. Realism is commended by its proponents as the only philosophy that can explain the impressive success of science and critiqued by its opponents for disregarding the underdetermination of science as well as its numerous failures. Ben-Menahem contributions to the debate around realism include her critique of the argument from success, her analysis of underdetermination and equivalent descriptions, her defense of the pragmatist concept of truth, and her highlighting the description-sensitivity of scientific laws.

Ben-Menahem has written on  Jorge Luis Borges, Donald Davidson, Michel Foucault, William James, Emil Meyerson, Henri Poincaré.

Awards and recognition
In 2022, Ben-Menachem won the Israel Prize for the study of philosophy and religious sciences.

Published works 
Conventionalism (Cambridge University Press, 2006)
Causation in Science (Princeton University Press, 2018)

Books edited 
Hilary Putnam (Cambridge University Press, 2005)
Probability in Physics (with Meir Hemmo) (Springer, 2012)

Selected articles 
 "Natural Laws and Human Language" in Engaging Putnam J. Conant and S. Chakraborty (eds.) (De Greuter) (2020) (forthcoming).
 (With Hanina Ben-Menahem) "The Rule of Law: Natural, Human and Divine" Studies in the History and Philosophy of Science 35  (2020) 139–159.
 "The PBR Theorem: Whose Side is it On?"  Studies in the History and Philosophy of Modern Physics 57 (2017) 80–88.
 “Borges on Replication and Concept Formation” in: Stepping in the Same River Twice, A. Shavit and A.M. Ellison (eds.) (Yale University Press) (2017) 23–36.
 "If Counterfactuals Were Excluded from Historical Reasoning…" Journal of the Philosophy of History 10 (2016) 370–381
 “The Web and the Tree: Quine and James on the Growth of Knowledge” in Quine and His Place in History, F. Janssen-Lauret and G. Kemp (eds) Palgrave (2016) 59–75.
 “Poincare’s Impact on Twentieth Century Physics” HOPOS 6 (2016) 257–273.
 “Revisiting the Refutation of Conventionalism”, The Library of Living Philosophers XXXIV, The Philosophy of Hilary Putnam, E. Auxier, D.R. Anderson, L.E. Hahn (eds), Open Court (2015) 451–478.
 “Historical Necessity and Contingency” in: The Blackwell Companion to the Philosophy of History, A. Tucker (ed) Blackwells (2009) 120–130
 . “Convention: Poincare and Some of his Critics”, British Journal for the     philosophy of Science 52 (2001) 471–513.
  “Direction and Description”, Studies in the History and Philosophy of Modern Physics 32 (2001) 621–635.
 “Dummett Versus Bell on Quantum Mechanics”, Studies in the History and Philosophy of Modern Physics 28(1997) 277–290. 
 "Equivalent Descriptions", The British Journal for the Philosophy of Science, 41(1990) 261–279.
 "The Inference to the Best Explanation", Erkenntnis 33 (1990) 319- 344.

See also
Women of Israel

References

External links 

 Academic profile: Hebrew University of Jerusalem
Yemima Ben-Menahem, The "Newton's Secrets" at the National Library of Israel.

Living people
1946 births
Analytic philosophers
21st-century Israeli philosophers
20th-century Israeli philosophers
Philosophers of science
Academic staff of the Hebrew University of Jerusalem
Lecturers